Rishitin is a terpenoid compound, produced by some plants belonging to the Solanum family, including the potato and tomato. Rishitin belongs to a heterogeneous group of anti-microbial plant defense compounds termed phytoalexins and is produced upon pathogen attack. Same as the phytoalexin capsidiol, it belongs to the group of sesquiterpenes and is as such an FPP derivative.
Rishitin was named after the potato cultivar Rishiri, where it was first discovered in 1968.

Biosynthesis
The biosynthetic pathway of rishitin has not yet been fully elucidated, and is still an active topic of research. Currently, the enzymes responsible for the synthesis of rishitin have not yet been discovered. Studies using radioisotope labeled compounds, revealed however that solavetivone, 15-hydroxysolavetivone, lubimin and 3-hydroxylubimin are precursors of rishitin.

References 

Sesquiterpenes
Terpenes found in Solanaceae